Maharishi Arvind Institute of Engineering & Technology (or MAIET) is a self-financed engineering college in Jaipur, India. It is ranked 1st in Rajasthan Technical University, Kota. MAIET was established in 1999 in the State of Rajasthan. The institute is spread over 6 acres of land in the locality of Jaipur. Railway station and bus stand (Sindhi Camp) are in the range of 8–9 km from the college.

Campus

Buildings 
MAIET's  primary campus is located in Mansarovar, Jaipur. It includes class rooms, computer centre, conference hall, library, auditorium, various laboratories/workshops and administration block.

Library 
The Institute has a computerized central library with reading hall for the students, having a collection of more than 50,000 books and reference books. MAIET Library enjoys membership of DELNET (Digital Network Library) and subscribes to three online E-resources like IEL, ASME, & DEL which helps students to access umpteen numbers of journals in various disciplines of science, engineering, pharmacy & management.

  There is a wide variety of magazines & journals on different subjects of engineering, environment & current issues as well. There are about 600 project reports & 300 educational CD's available in the Library. Being a member of DELNET (Digital Network Library) provides access to 400 international research journals. Besides this the Library regularly subscribes to about 40 journals and 30 scientific magazines related to the various engineering branches along with other magazines of general reading. The Institute's library also offer a Book-Bank scheme for the needy students. There are about 500 project reports and 300 educational CD's available in the library.

Entrepreneur development cell 
To encourage youngsters to take up entrepreneurial challenge, appropriate institutional support is required to become a dynamic institution that will motivate and train young entrepreneurs particularly first generation entrepreneurs. MAIET’s mission is expected to be achieved by using innovative training techniques, by using competent faculty, support & consultancy, quality teaching & training material in order to spearhead an entrepreneurship movement in the State of Rajasthan.

Auditorium 
The institute has an auditorium for the purpose of conferences, discussions, seminars and presentations with a seating capacity of approximately 250 persons.

Hostel facilities 
The institute has separate hostels for boys and girls. The mess is running in the campus itself. Facilities for indoor games are also available. Hostel is, however, available to a limited number of students, on first come first served basis.

Courses
The Bachelor of Technology - B.Tech degree prepares technical communicators to enter a fast-growing, rewarding professional career. MAIET's quality B.Tech/B.Eng Program is one of only a few in the Rajasthan located within an engineering college.

MAIET offers B.Tech. (Bachelor of Technology) courses in the following disciplines:

 Mechanical Engineering (ME)
 Computer Science and Engineering (CSE)
 Electronics and Communication Engineering (ECE) 
 Electrical Engineering (EE)
 Civil Engineering
 MBA
 BHM & CT
 B Pharm (Bachelor of Pharmacy)

Affiliation
The affiliation to Maharishi Arvind Institute of engineering & technology is from  Rajasthan Technical University, Kota.  Rajasthan Technical University, Kota is one of the best state university in India. The college is also got certified from All India Council for Technical Education AICTE , RUHS, Jaipur & PCI, New Delhi.

References

Engineering colleges in Jaipur
All India Council for Technical Education
Educational institutions established in 1999
1999 establishments in Rajasthan